Anthony "Anton" Sorenson (born January 25, 2003) is an American professional soccer player who plays as a defender for the Philadelphia Union of Major League Soccer.

Club career
Sorenson began his youth career with Crew SC Academy Wolves, before moving to the Philadelphia Union in 2019. He made his debut with the club's reserve side, Philadelphia Union II, on August 1, 2020 against the Pittsburgh Riverhounds. In December 2021, he joined the first team, as an extreme hardship short-term loan ahead of a playoff match against New York City FC, as 11 players entered COVID-19 health and safety protocols.

On January 25, 2022, Sorenson signed a homegrown player contract with Philadelphia Union's first team roster.

Career statistics

Club

References

External links

Crew SC Academy Wolves at the USSDA website

2003 births
Living people
Sportspeople from Port-au-Prince
American soccer players
Haitian footballers
American people of Haitian descent
Haitian emigrants to the United States
Association football defenders
Philadelphia Union II players
USL Championship players
Soccer players from Michigan
Philadelphia Union players
Homegrown Players (MLS)
MLS Next Pro players